Mathias Asoma Puozaa is a Ghanaian politician and was the member of parliament for the Nadowli East constituency in the Upper West region of Ghana.

Early life and education 
Puozaa was born on 10 January 1948. He hails from Touri-Daffiama in the Upper West Region of Ghana. He attended the University of Edinburgh in Scotland. From that University he obtained a Master of Science in Community Education.

Career 

Puozaa is an educationist by profession.

Politics 
Puozaa is a member of the National Democratic Congress. He was elected as the member of parliament for the Nadowli East Constituency in the 2004 Ghanaian general elections. He thus represented the constituency in the 4th parliament of the 4th republic of Ghana from 7 January 2005 to 6 January 2009. He was elected with 6,095votes out of 10,144total valid votes cast. This was equivalent to 60.1% of the total valid votes cast. He was elected over Tingani Banoebara Jonas of the People's National Convention, Kasanga Raphael Kasim of the New Patriotic Party and Tiesaah Azaadong George of the Convention People's Party. These obtained 713votes, 3,221votes and 115votes of the total valid votes cast. These were equivalent to 7.0%, 31.8% and 1.1% of the total valid votes cast.

Personal life 
Puozaa is a Christian.

References 

1948 births
Living people
Alumni of the University of Edinburgh
National Democratic Congress (Ghana) politicians
Ghanaian MPs 2005–2009
Ghanaian MPs 2009–2013